Johnny Gylling (born March 25, 1956) is a Swedish Christian democratic politician, member of the Riksdag 1998–2006.

References

1956 births
Living people
Members of the Riksdag from the Christian Democrats (Sweden)
Members of the Riksdag 2002–2006
Place of birth missing (living people)
Members of the Riksdag 1998–2002